Papyrus 75 (formerly Papyrus Bodmer XIV–XV, now Hanna Papyrus 1), designated by the siglum  (in the Gregory-Aland numbering of New Testament manuscripts), is an early Greek New Testament manuscript written on papyrus. It contains text from the Gospel of Luke 3:18–24:53, and John 1:1–15:8. It is generally described as "the most significant" papyrus of the New Testament to be discovered so far. Using the study of comparative writing styles (palaeography), it has been traditionally dated to the third century. It is due to this early dating that the manuscript has a high evaluation, and the fact its text so closely resembles that of the fourth-century Codex Vaticanus (B).

It is currently housed in the Vatican Library (Hanna Papyrus 1) in Rome.

Description 
The manuscript is a codex (precursor to the modern book), made of papyrus, in single quire format (a single quire being a collection of pages placed on top of each other, then folded in half to create a book), measuring 27 x 13 cm. It has between 38–45 lines per page, containing most of the text of the Gospel of Luke and the Gospel of John. It originally contained about 144 pages, 102 which have survived, of which 20 are fragmentary.  The papyrus is of a smooth and fine quality, with the verso (vertical striped side) nearly as smooth as the recto (horizontal striped side), and feels like hand-woven linen. The writing is a clear and careful majuscule.  is one of the earliest manuscripts (along with ) of the Gospel of Luke, containing most of Luke 3:18–24:53. An unusual feature of this codex is that when the Gospel of Luke ends, the Gospel of John begins on the same page.

It uses a staurogram (⳨) in Luke 9:23, 14:27, and 24:7.

Text 
The Greek text of this codex is considered a representative of the Alexandrian text-type. The text-types are groups of different manuscripts which share specific or generally related readings, which then differ from each other group, and thus the conflicting readings can separate out the groups, which are then used to determine the original text as published; there are three main groups with names: Alexandrian, Western, and Byzantine). Textual critic and biblical scholar Kurt Aland placed it in Category I of his New Testament manuscript text classification system. Category I manuscripts are described as being manuscripts "of a very special quality, i.e., manuscripts with a very high proportion of the early text, presumably the original text, which has not been preserved in its purity in any one manuscript."

The text is closer to Codex Vaticanus (B) than to Codex Sinaiticus.

Some notable readings 
The manuscript lacks the Pericope of the Adulteress, usually placed in translations at John 7:53–8:11. This omission is supported by:   B A C L N T W X Δ Θ Ψ 0141 0211 3 9* 22 33 72 96 97 106 108 123 131 139 157 179* 249 250 253 565 1241 1333 1424 2768 a f l q sy ly pbo bopt; Or Hiermss; plus according to Tischendorf, at least 50 others (see manuscript evidence against PdA).

 (him) –  705 b
 (them) – Majority of manuscripts

 (but deliver us from evil) 
omit –   B L ƒ 700 vg sys sa, bo
incl. – Majority of manuscripts

  (There was a rich man, with the name N[in]eue, who clothed himself) – 36 37 sa
 (There was a rich man, who clothed himself) – Majority of manuscripts

(A scholion of uncertain date have  (There is also found, in certain copies, the name of the rich-man being called Ninevah).)

 (And Jesus said: Father forgive them, they know not what they do.)
omit –   B D W Θ 070 579 1241 a d sy sa bo
incl. – Majority of manuscripts

Luke 22:43–44
omit –   A B N T W 579 ℓ 844 sy sa bo
incl. – Majority of manuscripts

 (kingdom) – *
 (glory) – majority of mss

} (shepherd) –  sa, ac
 (door) – majority

History
The codex was discovered in the 1950s and once belonged to the Swiss book collector Martin Bodmer (thus its original designation, P. Bodmer XIV–XV). It was sold in 2006 and donated to the Vatican Library, which now refers to the manuscript as "Hanna Papyrus 1 (Mater Verbi)". The history before its discovery is unknown, but it is generally agreed the codex was originally made and used in Egypt. Evidence for this comes from a piece of papyrus stuck to the back of the codex's leather case, on which there was Coptic writing. Its writing appearance and use of paragraphos to indicate a change of speaker, also points towards an Egyptian provenance.

Date
The codex was originally assigned palaeographically to 175–225 CE by Victore Martin and Rodolphe Kasser. They compared the handwriting to manuscripts P.Oxy.XXI 2293, P.Oxy.XXII 2322, P.Oxy.XXIII 2362, P.Oxy.XXIII 2363, and P.Oxy.XXII 2370. There were also other codicological features which accorded with manuscripts firmly dated to the fourth century.

As such, as they're not securely dated manuscripts, having no definitive terminus ante or post quem (before/after) dates gives nothing objective to use when dating undated manuscripts. Martin and Kasser did provide two dateable examples, P.Flor. I 61 and P.FuadUniv. 19, albeit Nongbri argued the writing on either weren't as alike as the original editors suggested.

An alternative dating of 225–275 was suggested by Eric G. Turner, however he doesn't appear to have provided any palaeographical parallels for this dating.

It is currently dated by the INTF to 200–225 CE.

See also 
 List of New Testament papyri
 Bodmer Papyri

References

Bibliography 
 V. Martin, R. Kasser, Papyrus Bodmer XIV–XV: Evangiles de Luc et Jean, Vol. 1, Papyrus Bodmer XIV: Evangile de Luc chap. 3–24; vol. 2, Papyrus Bodmer XV: Evangile de Jean chap. 1–15, Cologny-Geneva: Biblioteca Bodmeriana, 1961.
 
 P. Orsini, "I papiri Bodmer: scritture e libri", Adamantius 21 (2015), 60–78
 K. Aland and B. Aland, The Text of the New Testament: An Introduction to the Critical Editions and to the  Theory and Practice of Modern Textual Criticism, trans. Erroll F. Rhodes, 2nd rev. ed. (Grand Rapids: Eerdmans, 1995)
 Gregory, A. The Reception of Luke and Acts in the Period Before Irenaeus, Mohr Siebeck, (2003) , p. 28

Images 

 Image of a page of Papyrus 75 (accessed 2007-09-26)

External links 
 
 Waltz, Robert B. NT Manuscripts: Papyri, Papyri .
 Bodmer Papyrus 14–15 arrives at the Vatican (accessed 2007-09-26) 
 Willker, Wieland. A Textual Commentary on the Greek Gospels, (undated+unfinished)

New Testament papyri
Papyrus 075
Manuscripts of the Vatican Library
Early Greek manuscripts of the New Testament
Gospel of John papyri
Gospel of Luke papyri